The Ireland men's national rugby league team, known as the Wolfhounds, is organised by Rugby League Ireland and represents Ireland in international rugby league. The representative team is composed largely of players of Irish descent who compete in the Super League as well as the Australasian National Rugby League. Ireland is also represented by an Ireland A side, which is made up of players from the Irish domestic competition.

Since Ireland began competing in international rugby league in 1995, it has participated in the 1995 Rugby League Emerging Nations Tournament, the 1996 Super League World Nines, and five Rugby League World Cups – 2000, 2008, 2013, 2017 and 2021. They have also competed in the Rugby League European Nations Cup. 
 
Although, the island of Ireland is separate from the island of Great Britain, Irish players such as Cork-born Brian Carney have in the past been selected to play for the Great Britain side.

History

The seeds of modern-day Rugby League in Ireland were sown in 1989 when Brian Corrigan founded the Dublin Blues Rugby League, a club that was primarily used by union players to keep fit during the summer by playing matches against touring British teams. In 1995 the British RFL established Ireland's first development officer and later that year Ireland played against the United States in Washington on St Patricks Day with Ireland winning 24–22. Wigan Warriors player Joe Lydon came on as a substitute despite also serving as the manager. Huddersfield Giants coach Terry Flanagan and former Great Britain international Niel Wood were the joint coaches. In August 1995 Ireland beat Scotland at the RDS Arena in Dublin as a curtain raiser to the charity shield match between Leeds Rhinos and Wigan Warriors. The matches were played before an attendance of 5,716, a record for an international rugby league match on Irish soil. Former Great Britain player Des Foy played for Ireland. Following their appearance at the 1995 Emerging Nations Tournament, they were invited to the Super League World Nines in Fiji where they finished 8th.

Flags and anthems

The Irish rugby league team is one of many Irish teams that draws its players from across the island of Ireland. It utilises the Four Provinces Flag of Ireland and the all-island anthem, "Ireland's Call". Unlike the Irish rugby union team, the Irish rugby league team does not play The Soldier's Song, the national anthem of the Irish state, in addition to Ireland's Call when playing at home.

1995 Emerging Nations Tournament 

Ireland were included in the tournament held in England and were placed in Group B alongside Moldova and Morocco. Ireland beat Moldova 48–24 before beating Morocco 42–6 to progress to the final. In the final Ireland lost 6–22 to the Cook Islands at Gigg Lane in Bury. Coached by Terry Flanagan, Ireland's squad included professionals Des Foy and Martin Crompton in an otherwise domestic based squad.

2000 World Cup

1997 saw more England-based Super League players making themselves available by use of the grandparent rule. The Irish team improved its standards but this development gave less opportunity for Irish-based players to get a chance to play. However, Irish-based players were included in the Irish squad for the triangular tournaments in 1998 against France and Scotland and 1999 against Scotland and Wales. 
Their success was enough to earn a place in the 2000 World Cup. Finishing top of their group, the Irish eventually lost 26–16 to England in the quarter-finals, but the performance set the scene for future developments in Ireland.

2008 World Cup

Ireland were drawn against Lebanon and Russia in Europe's 2008 Rugby League World Cup Qualifying Pool Two. Ireland topped the group with a 16–16 draw with Lebanon at Dewsbury on 2 November 2007. The draw meant Ireland qualified for the 2008 World Cup on points difference from Lebanon as both nations gained the same number of group points.

At the 2008 World Cup in Australia, Ireland were in Group C along with Tonga and Samoa. They lost to Tonga on 27 October in Parramatta, Sydney, but were victorious against Samoa, again in Parramatta, on 5 November and topped the group on points difference. As the group winners, they played Fiji, winners of Group B, for a chance to qualify for the semi-final. Fiji won 30–14 eliminating Ireland.

2013 World Cup 
For the 2013 World Cup  Ireland were drawn in group A alongside Australia, England and 2008 World Cup rivals Fiji. Ireland was granted automatic entry to the tournament due to their strong showing in the 2008 World Cup. Ireland lost all three group matches including a 0–50 defeat to eventual champions Australia in front of 5,021 fans at Thomond Park.

2017 World Cup

Ireland kicked off their campaign with a shock 36–12 win over Italy in Cairns. In the next pool match Ireland lost a narrow match to PNG 14–6 with PNG needing a 78th minute try to win the game. Ireland's final pool match was against Wales in Perth where they ran out comfortable winners 34–6.  Ireland did not progress to the next round of the tournament despite winning more games than Lebanon or Samoa who qualified for the last 8.

2021 World Cup 

Ireland started 2021 Rugby League World Cup qualification campaign in the 2018 European Championship, where they finished third with a win against Scotland and two losses against France and Wales. Ireland's third place finish required them to participate in the 2019 European play-off tournament to ensure qualification. Here they managed to achieve two wins against Italy and Spain, leading to their World Cup qualification. Ireland were drawn into Group C, alongside New Zealand, Lebanon and Jamaica. In April 2022 Offaly-born Ged Corcoran took over from Stuart Littler for the World Cup campaign. Ireland finished the tournament with a 1–2 record beating Jamaica in their opener, before losing to Lebanon and New Zealand.

Current squad
The 24-man national team squad selected for the 2021 Rugby League World Cup was announced on 29 September 2022.

Competitive records and ranking

Ireland compete in the Rugby League European Nations Cup and have participated in the Rugby League World Cup.

Overall record
Ireland's competitive record as of 29 October 2022

World Cup

A red box around the year indicates tournaments played within Ireland.

European Championship

Triangular Series

This one-off tournament was contested by Ireland, Scotland and Wales.

Coaches 
Updated as of 29 October 2022

Honours
1999 Triangular Series

Stadium & Attendance
In 2015 Rugby League Ireland announced that the Carlisle Grounds in Bray, County Wicklow would become the official home ground of the national team. Despite this announcement, Ireland have also subsequently used Morton Stadium in Santry as their home ground.  

Below is a list of the highest attendances for international rugby league matches in Ireland.

Individual Records
Statistics are up to date as of 30 October 2022. Bold indicates current player.

Notable players 
Below is a list of players who have also gained caps for either Australia, the Exiles, Great Britain or England in addition to their caps earned with Ireland.

 Australia

 Luke Keary
 Pat Richards
 Luke Ricketson
 Brett White

 England

 Ben Currie
 Ben Harrison
 Johnny Lawless
 Louie McCarthy-Scarsbrook
 Michael McIlorum
 Robbie Mulhern
 Steve Prescott

Exiles

 Shannon McDonnell

 Great Britain

 Phil Cantillon
 Brian Carney
 Mick Cassidy
 Gary Connolly
 Mark Forster
 Des Foy
 Chris Joynt
 Barrie McDermott
 Terry O'Connor
 Joe Philbin
 Ryan Sheridan

Ireland A 

The Ireland A team is selected from players in the Irish domestic competition, administered by Rugby League Ireland. The Ireland A side competed in the St Patrick's Day Challenge between 2000 and 2012 and in the Amateur Four Nations from 2003 to 2014.

See also

 Rugby league in Ireland
 Rugby League European Nations Cup
 Rugby League Emerging Nations Tournament
 Rugby League World Cup
 Rugby League Ireland
 List of Ireland national rugby league team players
 Ireland national rugby union team

References

External links
 Home page of Rugby League Ireland
 Rugby League International Site
 

 
National rugby league teams